Endeavour is a quarterly peer-reviewed academic journal published by Elsevier. It began as a scientific review publication published by Imperial Chemical Industries in 1942, and since has evolved into a scholarly journal covering the fields of history and philosophy of science, technology, and medicine. Its editor-in-chief is Don Opitz (DePaul University).

History
The journal was established during World War II, releasing its first issue in January 1942. It began as a scientific review journal published by the public relations department of Imperial Chemical Industries, with support from the British government. It was initially published in English, French, German, and Spanish editions. It later added an Italian edition. Through the 1940s, 1950s, and 1960s, the journal was distributed to scientists and academic libraries around Europe in an effort to promote scientific internationalism. ICI continued to run the journal as its house technical publication until January 1977, when it became the property of Pergamon Press, a commercial publisher. Pergamon then started renumbering the volumes, starting with volume 1 in 1977. Elsevier acquired Pergamon Press in 1991 and has published the journal since.

In the 1990s, Endeavour moved away from publishing scientific reviews and began to focus on the history of science. It is now commonly listed among journals in history, STS, and HPS.

Abstracting and indexing 
The journal is abstracted and indexed by:

According to the Journal Citation Reports, the journal has a 2017 impact factor of 0.500.

References

External links 
 

Quarterly journals
Elsevier academic journals
History of science journals
English-language journals
Publications established in 1942
1942 establishments in the United Kingdom